Patricio González (born December 20, 1979 in Buenos Aires) is an Argentine football midfielder.

Career

González started his career at Lanús in the Primera Division Argentina in 1998 but he was soon sold to second division side Arsenal de Sarandí. In 2002 Arsenal were promoted to the primera and in 2004 they played their first ever competitive international fixture against Club Bolívar of Bolivia.

During the summer of 2006 González and four other Argentine players were spotted by Germinal, González signed a 4-year contract with the club that should have kept him in Belgium until 2010, but he failed to impress, making only 7 appearances for the club before being loaned to Barcelona de Guayaquil.

In 2008, he joined up with All Boys of the Argentine 2nd division. One year later, he joined Ferro Carril Oeste in the same division.

External links
 Argentine Primera statistics  
 
 

Argentine footballers
Argentine people of Spanish descent
Association football midfielders
Argentine Primera División players
Club Atlético Lanús footballers
Arsenal de Sarandí footballers
All Boys footballers
Beerschot A.C. players
Barcelona S.C. footballers
Ferro Carril Oeste footballers
Argentine expatriate footballers
Expatriate footballers in Ecuador
Expatriate footballers in Belgium
Footballers from Buenos Aires
1979 births
Living people